Ipomoea aquatica, widely known as water spinach,  is a semi-aquatic, tropical plant grown as a vegetable for its tender shoots. I. aquatica is generally believed to have been first domesticated in Southeast Asia. It is widely cultivated in Southeast Asia, East Asia, and South Asia. It grows abundantly near waterways and requires little to no care.

Description
Ipomoea aquatica grows in water or on moist soil. The flowers are trumpet-shaped,  in diameter, and usually white in colour with a mauve centre. Propagation is either by planting cuttings of the stem shoots, which will root along nodes, or by planting the seeds from flowers that produce seed pods.

Names
Ipomoea aquatica is widely known as kangkong (also spelled kangkung), its common name in Maritime Southeast Asia, which possibly originates from Hokkien  ( 'hole') +  ( 'empty, hollow'). It is also known as water spinach, river spinach, water morning glory, water convolvulus, or by the more ambiguous names Chinese spinach, Chinese watercress, Chinese convolvulus or swamp cabbage.

Origin
The origin of Ipomoea aquatica is not quite clear, but it is generally believed to be native to Southeast Asia and was first cultivated there. This is supported by phylogenetic studies, its ideal climatic conditions, and the number of native pathogens in the region; as well as its predominant cultivation range, the prevalence in usage as food and traditional medicine, and the number of distinct native names in Southeast Asian languages. 

Several sources have also cited China or India as the location of the plant's domestication. However, these claims have no supporting evidence other than the appearance of the plant's name in historical records. The first clear mention of I. aquatica in Chinese records is in the Nanfang Caomu Zhuang written by the Chinese botanist Ji Han (AD 263-307). Ji Han specifically identifies I. aquatica as being "a strange vegetable of the south" with a foreign origin brought over by "western countries." The claim for an Indian origin is based on the presence of the old name  kalamba for the plant in Sanskrit, presumed to be from around 200 BC, but this is putative. 

There are also studies suggesting that the species is native to Africa, and it is debated whether it is part of African indigenous flora or whether it was introduced there by Chinese mariner Zheng He.

Cultivation

 
Ipomoea aquatica is most commonly grown in east, south, and southeast Asia. It flourishes naturally in waterways, and requires little if any care. It is used extensively in Indonesian, Burmese, Thai, Lao, Cambodian, Malay, Vietnamese, Filipino, and Chinese cuisine, especially in rural or kampung (village) areas. The vegetable is also extremely popular in Taiwan, where it grows well. During the Japanese occupation of Singapore in World War II, the vegetable grew remarkably easily in many areas, and became a popular wartime crop. 

Water spinach has been found to be cultivated in the following countries:

Australia
Bangladesh
Burma
Cambodia
China
Fiji
India
Maldives
Indonesia
Japan
Malaysia
Nepal
New Guinea
Philippines
Sri Lanka
Taiwan
Thailand
Vietnam

In the United States it is cultivated in California, Florida, Hawaii, Texas, Arizona, and the U.S. Virgin Islands. It is also found in Africa and in its wild form, is collected and used by the Sambaa people in Tanzania.

Water spinach is also potentially suitable for cultivation in greenhouses in more temperate regions.

In non-tropical areas, it is easily grown in containers given enough water in a bright sunny location. It readily roots from cuttings.

Requirements for climate and soil

Water spinach is ideal for sub-tropical and tropical climate, as it does not grow well below  and is sensitive to frost. High soil moisture is beneficial for the growth. Clay soils and marshy soils rich in organic matter are suitable for water spinach. The ideal pH range for the growth is from 5 to 7. The provision of shade has been shown to have a positive influence on the yield of water spinach.

Traditional cultivation methods

Water spinach is cultivated in a variety of systems. In Hong Kong, two methods are traditionally used: the dryland method and the wetland method.

In the dryland method, water spinach is grown on raised beds which are separated by irrigation ditches. The seeds can be sown directly onto the beds. Alternatively, a nursery may be used and the seedlings are transplanted when they reach a sufficient size. Regular irrigation is crucial in the dryland system and so is a sufficient fertilization. Water spinach cultivated with the dryland method is ready for harvest 50 to 60 days after sowing. Harvesting is being done by pulling up the whole plant.

The wetland method is the traditionally more common and important method for cultivation in Hong Kong: In the wetland method, water spinach is cultivated on flat fields surrounded by raised banks, which have oftentimes been used as rice paddies in the past. These former rice paddies have a heavy clay soil with an iron-pan. This helps to retain water for the water spinach. The seedlings to be used in this methods are usually grown in a nursery on a dry field, as the germination under water is quite poor. Six weeks after sowing the seedlings, cuttings for transplantation can be taken from them. The soil itself is tramped into a liquid mud so that the cuttings can root easily. The first harvest in the wetland method can usually be done at around 30 days after the transplantation. Also, the harvesting differs from the dryland system: In the wetland, the upper part of the main shoot is cut at about water level. This stimulates lateral growth and produces horizontal shoots carrying vertical branches. After the first harvests, every seven to ten days throughout the summer, these vertical branches can be harvested. After the planting period, the fields are drained and once the fruit of the water spinach is ripe, it is harvested, dried, then trodden to release the seeds which are to be used for the following season.

Use of fertilizer
How much fertilizer is used for the cultivation strongly depends on the region. Most research is from the '80s and '90s. Generally, it has been shown that a dose of  N/ha is sufficient and that the application of K can be beneficial on the yield. Also, the application of plant growth regulators, for example Adenine and Zetanine, has been found to be an effective means to promote water spinach growth. One study has determined, that the highest yields are produced with the application of 60 kg/ha of N, 90 kg/ha of P2O5 and 50 kg/ha of K2O for the first harvest. For the second harvest the optimal fertilization was determined as 120 kg/ha of N, 45 kg/ha of P2O5 and 100 kg/ha of K2O.

Taiwan: In Taiwan, the usual fertilization includes the basic application of about 10 t/ha of cowdung followed by 50 kg/ha of ammonium sulfate after each harvest.
 
Bangkok: In Bangkok, it is common to apply about 300 kg/ha of NPK fertilizer twice a month.
 
Indonesia: In Indonesia, usually 150 kg to 300 kg of NPK are applied per hectare.

Pathogens and pests

There are several pathogens and pests reported, affecting I. aquatica. Pythium causes problems like damping-off, Cercospora leaf spot and root nematodes. Also, aphids may be problems in fields. Additionally, there are several polyphagous insects feeding on I. aquatica. Lepidoptera species include Diacrisia strigatula Walker and Spodoptera litura. The “woolly-bear” caterpillars (D. virginica [Fabricius]) of the eastern United States and Diacrisia strigatula (Chinese tiger moth) are other species with wide food preferences. A specialist pathogen on I. aquatica is the oomycete Albugo ipomoeae-aquaticae, though its range is restricted to southern and southeast Asia.

Invasiveness
Ipomoea aquatica is listed by the USDA as a noxious weed, especially in the states of Florida, California, and Hawaii, where it can be observed growing in the wild. In the US, water spinach has mainly become a problem in Florida; why is unclear although the fast growth rate has been cited as a threat to native plants in certain areas of Florida. It could be owing to the time since introduction, or owing to climatic factors. I. aquatica has been extensively cultivated in Texas for over 30 years, having been originally brought there by Asian immigrants. Because no evidence indicates the plant has escaped into the wild, Texas lifted its ban on cultivation for personal use with no restrictions or requirements, noting its importance as a vegetable in many cultures, and also began permitting cultivation for commercial sales with the requirement of an exotic species permit. Possession of I. aquatica has been prohibited in Florida since 1973, but it is still being grown and sold illegally. Some of the infestations in Florida public lakes have been eradicated, or at least attempts have been made. In Sri Lanka it invades wetlands, where its long, floating stems form dense mats which can block the flow of water and prevent the passage of boats.

Culinary uses

The vegetable is a common ingredient in East, South and Southeast Asian dishes, such as in stir-fried water spinach. In Singapore, Indonesia, and Malaysia, the tender shoots along with the leaves are usually stir-fried with chili pepper, garlic, ginger, dried shrimp paste (belacan/terasi) and other spices. In Penang and Ipoh, it is cooked with cuttlefish and a sweet and spicy sauce. Also known as eng chhai in the Hokkien dialect, it can also be boiled with preserved cuttlefish, then rinsed and mixed with spicy rojak paste to become jiu hu eng chhai. Boiled eng chhai also can be served with fermented krill noodle belacan bihun and prawn mi.

In Burmese cuisine, water spinach is the primary ingredient in a Burmese salad called gazun ywet thoke, made with blanched water spinach, lime juice, fried garlic and garlic oil, roasted rice flour and dried shrimp.

In Indonesian cuisine it is called kangkung, boiled or blanched together with other vegetables it forms the ingredient of gado-gado or pecel salads in peanut sauce. Some recipes that use kangkung is plecing kangkung from Lombok, and mie kangkung (kangkong noodle) from Jakarta.

In Thailand, where it is called phak bung, it is eaten raw, often along with green papaya salad or nam phrik, in stir-fries and in curries such as kaeng som.

In the Philippines, where it is called kangkóng, the tender shoots are cut into segments and cooked, together with the leaves, in fish and meat stews, such as sinigang. The vegetable is also commonly eaten alone. In adobong kangkóng (also called apan-apan), it is sautéed in cooking oil, onions, garlic, vinegar, and soy sauce. In ensaladang kangkóng (or kinilaw na kangkóng), it is blanched and served in vinegar or calamansi juice and fresh tomatoes and onions with salt and pepper to taste. In binagoongang kangkóng (or ginisang kangkóng), it is sautéed with garlic and topped with bagoong alamang (shrimp paste) or bagoong isda (fermented fish) and sliced fresh tomatoes and onions, commonly also with cubed crispy liempo (pork belly) or pork adobo. It can also be spiced with siling haba or siling labuyo peppers, soy sauce, black pepper, and sugar. It differs from adobong kangkóng in that it does not use vinegar. A local appetiser called crispy kangkóng has the leaves coated in a flour-based batter and fried until crisp, similar to Japanese vegetable tempura.

Other uses

Phytoremediation
Using aquatic macrophytes to remove nutrients from wastewater and to control freshwater eutrophication has been reported to be a feasible way of phytoremediation. Various plants, including I. aquatica, have been tested for this use. Owing to its being edible and thus marketable, it could be an attractive option for this use.

Animal feed
Water spinach is fed to livestock as green fodder with high nutritive value—especially the leaves, for they are a good source of carotene. It is fed to cattle, pigs, fish, ducks, and chicken. Moreover, it is mentioned that in limited quantities, I. aquatica can have a somewhat laxative effect.

Health effects

Medicinal use
I. aquatica is used in the traditional medicine of southeast Asia and in the traditional medicine of some countries in Africa. In southeast Asian medicine it is used against piles, and nosebleeds, as an anthelmintic, and to treat high blood pressure. In Ayurveda, leaf extracts are used against jaundice and nervous debility. In indigenous medicine in Sri Lanka, water spinach is supposed to have insulin-like properties. Water extracts of I. aquatica showed a blood sugar-lowering effect in Wistar rats. An aqueous juice of 100g plant material was given 30 minutes before eating glucose to diabetes 2 patients. After two hours it could be observed that blood glucose peak level was reduced by around 30%.

Also antioxidant bioactive compounds and anti-microbial substances could be detected in water spinach. Furthermore, plant extracts of water spinach inhibit cancer cell growth of Vero, Hep-2 and A-549 cells, though have moderate anti-cancer activity.

Health risk
Many of the waters where water spinach grows are fed by domestic or other waste. Pigs in southeast Asia are a natural reservoir for the parasite Fasciolopsis buski. Infections in the Mekong regions resulted from feeding on water spinach. Infections of F. buski in humans through water spinach can be anticipated. The infection can be prevented by proper preparation such as frying or boiling. Contamination with thermotolerant coliforms (ThC) or protozoan bacteria with fecal origin, are very likely when the water spinach is planted in wastewater fed urban systems. Water spinach has great potential as a purifier of aquatic habitats. It is an efficient accumulator of cadmium, lead, and mercury. This characteristic can be dangerous if water spinach is planted for human or animal feed in polluted aquatic systems. Mercury in water spinach is composed mostly as methylmercury and has the highest potential of becoming a threat to human health. The edible parts of the plant have a lower heavy metal concentration. The stems and bottom of the edible portion of the plant are higher in concentration and should be removed to minimize the heavy metal intake.

Gallery

See also
 Stir-fried water spinach
 List of vegetables
 Sweet potato (Ipomoea batatas), another edible species in the morning glory family

References

External links

Germplasm Resources Information Network: Ipomoea aquatica

Water spinach nutritional information from Kasetsart University
Center for Aquatic, Wetland and Invasive Plants, University of Florida
USDA Federal Noxious Weed Regulations (Possession in USA requires permit)
Species Profile - Water Spinach (Ipomoea aquatica), National Invasive Species Information Center, United States National Agricultural Library. Lists general information and resources for water spinach.

aquatica
Invasive plant species in Sri Lanka
Leaf vegetables
Perennial vegetables
Plants described in 1775
Asian vegetables